Morrisburg is a ghost town in Guthrie County, Iowa, United States.

History 
Morrisburg (historically spelled Morrisburgh) was laid out in 1855 by James Moore and Jonathan J. Morris.  The town was originally called Fairview, but the name was changed in 1856 when it was discovered that there was already a Fairview in Iowa.

References 

Ghost towns in Iowa
Unincorporated communities in Guthrie County, Iowa
1855 establishments in Iowa
Populated places established in 1855